Fairacres is a census-designated place and unincorporated community in Doña Ana County, New Mexico, United States. Its population was 824 as of the 2010 census. Fairacres has a post office with ZIP code 88033, which opened on June 15, 1926. U.S. Route 70 passes through the community.

Demographics

Education
It is located in Las Cruces Public Schools. The district operates Fairacres Elementary School.

Notable person
Barbara Funkhouser, first woman to serve as editor of the El Paso Times (1980–1986), operated the Tatreault Vineyard in Fairacres

References

Census-designated places in New Mexico
Census-designated places in Doña Ana County, New Mexico